Huntington Branch is a  long 1st order tributary to Stony Creek in Surry County, North Carolina.

Course 
Huntington Branch rises about 1 mile southeast of Lambsburg, Virginia in Carroll County and then flows southeast into North Carolina to join Stony Creek about 4 miles northeast of Crooked Oak, North Carolina.

Watershed 
Huntington Branch drains  of area, receives about 48.4 in/year of precipitation, has a wetness index of 344.91, and is about 54% forested.

See also 
 List of Rivers of North Carolina
 List of Rivers of Virginia

References 

Rivers of Surry County, North Carolina
Rivers of Carroll County, Virginia
Rivers of North Carolina
Rivers of Virginia